

Aztec Empire
14th century — Tlaltecatzin of Cuauhchinanco (Texcoco (altepetl)) writes his poem.
late 14th-mid 15th centuries — Tochimhuitzin of Coyolchighuihqui (Tenochtitlan), son of Itcoatl writes several poems in Nahuatl.

Europe
 1323 – The name Pléiade is adopted by a group of fourteen poets (seven men and seven women) in Toulouse.
 1360 – The future English poet Geoffrey Chaucer is captured by the French during the Reims campaign of the Hundred Years' War and ransomed by King Edward III of England.

Works
 The Divine Comedy, written by Dante Alighieri c.1308-21 in the Tuscan dialect of Italian.
 Petrarch writes the Africa in Latin, for which he was crowned Poet Laureate, and the Canzoniere in Italian, critical in the development of the sonnet tradition.
  written in Middle High German, early 14th century; earliest surviving manuscript fragment c.1380.
 Lamentations of Mary, first recorded Hungarian language poem, is transcribed at the beginning of the century.
 Eric Chronicles, 1320–1321, Sweden.
 1310–1314 –  written by Gervais de Bus and Chaillou de Pesstain, France.
 1330–1343 – The Book of Good Love written by Juan Ruiz, Archpriest of Hita, Spain (Castile).
 1398 – Anselm Turmeda, also known as "Abdullah at-Tarjuman" عبد الله الترجمان, Spanish work by a poet who later converts to Islam and writes in Arabic.

British Isles
 1327 – The deposed King Edward II of England perhaps writes the "Lament of Edward II".
 After 1350 – The Pearl Poet writes Sir Gawain and the Green Knight in Northern England.
 c. 1367 (earliest likely date) – William Langland (presumably) writes Piers Plowman.
 Late 1368? – Geoffrey Chaucer composes his first major poem, The Book of the Duchess. 
 1375 – Barbour composes The Brus, the earliest poem in vernacular Early Scots.
 1381: May 30–November – Peasants' Revolt in England. Preacher John Ball apparently cites the poem Piers Plowman (which is revised during this decade) and John Gower includes an account of the events in his Vox Clamantis.
 1386: October – Geoffrey Chaucer is obliged to give up most of his official offices in London and retires to Kent (in South East England) where he may work on The Canterbury Tales.
 Hendregadredd Manuscript, containing the Welsh Poetry of the Princes anthology, and the Red Book of Hergest, another important Welsh literary manuscript.

Arab world
Ibn Juzayy (1321–1340)
Safi al-din al-Hilli, (died c. 1339)
Ibn Nubatah al-Misri, (died 1366)
 Anselm Turmeda, also known as "Abd-Allah at-Tarjuman" (1355–1423), Catalan Spanish, then Arabic poet

Persian language

Persian-language poets
 Hafez, poet (born about 1310-1325)
 Rashid-al-Din Hamadani, Jewish convert into Islam (1247-1318)
 Shams Tabrizi
 Khwaju Kermani
 Mahmoud Shabestari
 Ubayd Zakani
 Shahin Shirazi
 Junayd Shirazi
 Kamal od-Din Esmail
 Jamal ad-Din Isfahani
 Awhadi Maraghai
 Ghiyas al-Din ibn Rashid al-Din
 Shah Nimatullah Wali
 Amir Khusrow, Sufi, writing in Persian and Hindustani (1253-1325)

Works
 Hasht-Bihisht, written by Amir Khusrow about 1302

Japan

Japanese works published
Imperial poetry anthologies:
 Gyokuyō Wakashū
 Shokusenzai Wakashū
 Shokugoshūi Wakashū
 Fūga Wakashū
 Shinsenzai Wakashū
 Shinshūi Wakashū
 Shingoshūi Wakashū

Japanese poets
 Asukai Gayu 飛鳥井雅有, also known as "Asukai Masaari" (1241–1301), Kamakura period nobleman and poet; has 86 poems in the official anthology Shokukokin Wakashū
Chūgan Engetsu (1300–1375), poet and Zen Buddhist monk of the Rinzai sect who headed many Zen establishments
Eifuku-mon In 永福門院, also written "Eifuku Mon'in", also known as Saionji Shōko 西園寺しょう子, 西園寺鏱子 (1271–1342) Kamakura period poet and a consort of the 92nd emperor, Fushimi; she belonged to the Kyōgoku school of verse; has poems in the Gyokuyōshū anthology
Ikkyū 一休宗純, Ikkyū Sōjun (1394–1481), eccentric, iconic, Rinzai Zen Buddhist priest, poet and sometime mendicant flute player who influenced Japanese art and literature with an infusion of Zen attitudes and ideals; one of the creators of the formal Japanese tea ceremony; well known to Japanese children through various stories and the subject of a popular Japanese children's television program; made a character in anime fiction
Jakushitsu Genkō 寂室元光 (1290–1367), Rinzai Zen master, poet, flute player, and first abbot of Eigen-ji, which was constructed solely for him to teach Zen
Jien 慈円 (1155–1225) poet, historian, and Buddhist monk
Jinzai Kiyoshi 神西清 (1903–1957) Shōwa period novelist, translator, literary critic, poet and playwright
Munenaga 宗良 親王 (1311 – c. 1385) Nanboku-chō period imperial prince (eighth son of Emperor Godaigo) and poet of the Nijō poetic school who is known for his compilation of the Shin'yō Wakashū poetry anthology
 Sesson Yūbai 雪村友梅 (1290–1348), poet and Buddhist priest of the Rinzai sect who founded temples
 Shōtetsu 正徹 (1381–1459), considered by some the last great poet in the courtly waka tradition; his disciples were important in the development of renga, which led to haiku
Ton'a 頓阿  also spelled as "Tonna"; lay name: Nikaidō Sadamune 二階堂貞宗 (1289–1372), poet and Buddhist monk

Other in East Asia
 Yi Saek (1328–1395), Korea
 U Tak (1262–1342), Korea
 Zhao Luanluan (fl. 1341–1367), Yuan dynasty Chinese female erotic poet (death by sati)

South Asia
 Vemana (Gona Budda Reddy, fl. c.1300–1310) translates Ranganatha ramayan (శ్రీ రంగనాథ రామాయణం) into Telugu
 Yerrapragada (fl. c.1325–1350) concludes translation of Mahabharata as Andhra Mahabharatam into Telugu
 Janabai (d. 1350), female Marathi religious poet in the Hindu tradition
 Srinatha (1365–1450), Telugu, popularizes the Prabhanda style
 Nund Rishi (1377–1440), Indian, Kashmiri-language poet

Decades and years

References

 01
Poetry by century